The Ecuador Open  is a men's professional golf tournament held in Ecuador. The tournament was re-inaugurated as an event on the PGA Tour Latinoamérica in 2014 and the inaugural winner was Tyler McCumber.

Winners

References

External links
Coverage on the PGA Tour Latinoamérica official site

PGA Tour Latinoamérica events
Golf tournaments in Ecuador
Recurring sporting events established in 2014
2014 establishments in Ecuador